Mahamaya is a small town in Durg District, Chhattisgarh, India. The town is near the Mahamaya Mines at Dalli Rajhara operated by the Bhilai Steel Plant.

Township
The Mahamaya township is situated below the mines. Facilities such as schools and hospitals are provided by the Bhilai Steel Plant.

Tourism
The town is the site of the Mahamaya Temple, located on the hills, and Bordi Dam, a picnic spot nearby.

Photos
Mahamaya Temple
Vighnavinashanaya Ganesh, Mahamaya, Chhattisgarh

Cities and towns in Durg district